The 1998 Speedway Conference League was the third tier/division of British speedway.

Summary
The title was won by St Austell Gulls.

Final league table

+ withdrew - Norfolk replaced Skegness and took over fixtures

Conference League Knockout Cup
The 1998 Conference league Knockout Cup was the first edition of the Knockout Cup for tier three teams.

In 1995 there had been an Academy League Knockout Cup and in 1996 a Conference League Knockout Cup but due to a merger of the British Leagues, both the 1995 and 1996 editions acted as the second tier of British speedway at the time.

First round

Semi-finals

Final

Conference League Riders' Championship
Winner - Steve Bishop (St. Austell)

See also
List of United Kingdom Speedway League Champions
Knockout Cup (speedway)

References

Conference
Speedway Conference League